Mughni is a village in the Ashtarak Municipality of the Aragatsotn Province of Armenia. It is located just to the north of Ashtarak town and belongs to its municipality. Until the Russian conquest, it was the southernmost town in the district of Aparan. Mughni is home to the 14th-century Saint Gevork Monastery, which was formerly a popular pilgrimage site and the seat of an archbishop. The dome of the church was rebuilt in the 1660s.

Gallery

See also 
Saint Gevork Monastery of Mughni

References

Populated places in Aragatsotn Province
Christian pilgrimages